Bishopville Commercial Historic District is a national historic district located at Bishopville, Lee County, South Carolina.  It encompasses 48 contributing buildings in the central business district of Bishopville.  All of the commercial buildings are of brick construction with most constructed between 1890 and 1920. All of the buildings are used for commercial purposes such as stores, restaurants, offices and banks. Two important buildings are the Seaboard Coastline Depot and the Palmetto Oil Mill.

It was added to the National Register of Historic Places in 1986.

References

Commercial buildings on the National Register of Historic Places in South Carolina
Historic districts on the National Register of Historic Places in South Carolina
Neoclassical architecture in South Carolina
Buildings and structures in Lee County, South Carolina
National Register of Historic Places in Lee County, South Carolina